The Nagamori Award is an international award given by Nagamori Foundation of Kyoto, Japan. The award is to recognize outstanding researchers and engineers working on electrical and electronics engineering, especially related to motors, power generation, actuators, and energy related topics.

History
The awarded is founded by Shigenobu Nagamori in 2014, with the purpose of recognizing global researchers and engineers who have made outstanding and innovative technological advances in the area of electrical motors and power generation.

Awards details
The award is made annually to outstanding early to mid-career researchers and engineers. There will be six awards given annually, with one of the awards named as the Grand Nagamori award. The prize money of two million yen is awarded to each regular Nagamori award while the grand award comes with a cash prize of five million yen. An award ceremony is held in Kyoto, Japan around September each year, where winners will be present to receive their prizes.

Recent winners
The following are some of the recent winners.

References 

International awards
Engineering awards
Electrical and electronic engineering awards
Japanese science and technology awards